LocalVision was a group of community access channels that broadcast on the Optus Vision cable television service.

References

External links

Television channels and stations established in 1996
Television channels and stations disestablished in 1998
English-language television stations in Australia
Defunct television channels in Australia